Askomill House, also known as Askomull House, was a fortified house north east of Campbeltown, Kintyre, Argyll and Bute, Scotland.

History

16th century
Angus MacDonald, 8th of Dunnyveg, while at his Kintyre house in 1598, was surrounded by 100-200 armed men led by his son James MacDonald who had been sent by the Privy Council to seek his fathers submission to King James V of Scotland. Angus refused to come out from his house and suffered burns after his son James set fire to the house and was subsequently captured and held in irons at Smerby Castle.

Notes

References

Castles in Argyll and Bute
Clan Donald
Kintyre